Martin B. Moore Sr. (April 12, 1937 – February 3, 2022) was an American politician from Alaska.

Biography
He served in the Alaska House of Representatives from 1971 to 1972. Moore later served as the city manager of Emmonak.

Moore died from COVID-19 complications on February 3, 2022, at the age of 84.

References

1937 births
2022 deaths
American city managers
Businesspeople from Alaska
Democratic Party members of the Alaska House of Representatives
Native American state legislators in Alaska
People from Kusilvak Census Area, Alaska
Yupik people
Deaths from the COVID-19 pandemic in Alaska